The 1987 Segunda División de Chile was the 36th season of the Segunda División de Chile.

Deportes La Serena was the tournament's champion.

Aggregate table

North Zone

South Zone

See also
Chilean football league system

References

External links
 RSSSF - List of Second Division Champions

Segunda División de Chile (1952–1995) seasons
Primera B
1987 in South American football leagues